Andre Agassi defeated Rainer Schüttler in the final, 6–2, 6–2, 6–1 to win the men's singles tennis title at the 2003 Australian Open. It was his fourth Australian Open title, and his eighth and last major title overall. With the win, Agassi claimed his 21st consecutive match win at the Australian Open, as he won the title in 2000 and 2001 (he withdrew from the 2002 event due to injury).

Thomas Johansson was the reigning champion, but did not participate due to injury.

Tim Henman and Greg Rusedski's withdrawals from the tournament meaning there were no British players ever competed in the tournament since the major has become restricted to amateurs into professional circuit in 1968.

This event marked the first main-draw major appearance for David Ferrer, who lost to Lee Hyung-taik in the first round; it was also the final major appearance for former world No. 4 Richard Krajicek.

Seeds
The seeded players are listed below. Andre Agassi is the champion; others show the round in which they were eliminated.

  Lleyton Hewitt (fourth round)
  Andre Agassi (champion)
  Marat Safin (third round, withdrew)
  Juan Carlos Ferrero (quarterfinals)
  Carlos Moyá (second round)
  Roger Federer (fourth round)
  Jiří Novák (third round)
  Albert Costa (third round)
  Andy Roddick (semifinals)
  David Nalbandian (quarterfinals)
  Paradorn Srichaphan (second round)
  Sébastien Grosjean (quarterfinals)
  Fernando González (second round)
  Guillermo Cañas (second round)
  Àlex Corretja (first round)
  Sjeng Schalken (second round)
  Gastón Gaudio (second round)
  Younes El Aynaoui (quarterfinals)
  Juan Ignacio Chela (second round)
  Xavier Malisse (third round)
  Andrei Pavel (first round, retired)
  Yevgeny Kafelnikov (second round)
  James Blake (fourth round)
  Nicolás Lapentti (third round)
  Mikhail Youzhny (fourth round)
  Tommy Robredo (first round)
  Jan-Michael Gambill (second round)
  Fabrice Santoro (third round)
  Nicolas Escudé (third round)
  Gustavo Kuerten (second round)
  Rainer Schüttler (final)
  Stefan Koubek (first round)

Draw

Finals

Top draw

Section 1

Section 2

Section 3

Section 4

Bottom draw

Section 5

Section 6

Section 7

Section 8

Other entry information

Wild cards

Protected ranking

Qualifiers

Lucky losers

Withdrawals
Before the tournament

During the tournament
  Marat Safin

Notes

References

External links
 Association of Tennis Professionals (ATP) – 2003 Australian Open Men's Singles draw
 2003 Australian Open – Men's draws and results at the International Tennis Federation

Mens singles
Australian Open (tennis) by year – Men's singles